Hong Wei Jian (born 20 August 1985), also known as "Flyboy", is a Singapore basketball player who plays for the Singapore Slingers.

Club career

In 2008, Hong played a few games with the Singapore Slingers while the team was competing in the 2008/09 Singapore Challenge Series.

On August 2009, Hong signed a one-year contract to play for the Singapore Slingers, along with Pathman Matialakan. Hong was named the Slingers' Most Improved Player for the 2009-2010 ABL season on the Slingers Awards Night on 17 February 2010.

Hong retired from professional basketball after tearing his anterior cruciate ligament and fracturing his knee during the 2010-11 ABL season.

International career

Hong is also part of the Singapore men's national basketball team.

ABL Statistics

Season

|-
| align="left" | 2009-10
| align="left" | Slingers
| 18|| 12|| 17:55 || .427 || .371|| .622 || 2.2 || .8 || 1.08|| .00|| 7.6
|-
| align="left" | Career
| align="left" |
| 18|| 12 || 17:55 || .427|| .371|| .622 || 2.2  || .8 || 1.08|| .00 || 7.6

Playoffs

|-
| align="left" | 2009-10
| align="left" | Slingers
| 3 || 3 || 23:10 || .434 || .285 || .833 || 4.0 || 1.7 || 1.67 || .00 || 10.6
|-
| align="left" | Career
| align="left" |
| 3 || 3 || 23.10 || .434 || .285 || .833 || 4.0 || 1.7 || 1.67 || .00 || 10.6

References

External links
 Hong Wei Jian Player Profile
 ABL's interview with Hong Wei Jian

Singapore Slingers players
1985 births
Living people
Singaporean men's basketball players
Singaporean sportspeople of Chinese descent